Albert Band (May 7, 1924 – June 14, 2002) was a French-American film director and film producer. He was the son of artist Max Band, father of filmmaker Charles Band and of film composer Richard Band and the grandfather of Alex Band, Taryn Band and Rachael Band.

Life and career
Band was born in Paris, France, the son of Bertha (Finkelstein) and Max Band, an artist. His mother was born in Russia and his father was from Kudirkos Naumiestis, Lithuania. His family is Jewish. He escaped from Paris to the United States with his family prior to the occupation of France during World War II. He graduated from Hollywood High School.

Interested in film, he became an apprentice at Warner Bros. where he developed contacts eventually becoming an assistant director on John Huston's The Asphalt Jungle, then adapting the story The Red Badge of Courage for Huston's film of the same name.

He made his debut as a producer and director in The Young Guns (1956), combining the two then-popular genres of Westerns and juvenile delinquent films. In the late 1950s, he moved to Europe, producing a variety of films, beginning in Sweden with Face of Fire (1959), based on another of Stephen Crane's stories, The Monster.

Filmography

Producer
The Young Guns (1956) (producer) (uncredited)
I Bury the Living (1958) (producer)
Face of Fire (1959) (producer)
La leggenda di Enea (dir. Giorgio Venturini, 1962) (producer)
Duello nel Texas (dir. Ricardo Blasco, 1963) (producer)
Massacro al Grande Canyon (dir. Sergio Corbucci, 1964) (producer)
Hercules and the Princess of Troy (1965) (TV) (producer)
Gli uomini dal passo pesante (1965) (producer)
I crudeli (dir. Sergio Corbucci, 1967) (producer)
Un minuto per pregare, un instante per morire (dir. Franco Giraldi, 1968) (producer)
Little Cigars (dir. Chris Christenberry, 1973) (producer)
Mansion of the Doomed (dir. Michael Pataki, 1976) (supervising executive producer)
Cinderella (dir. Michael Pataki, 1977) (producer)
Dracula's Dog (1978) (producer)
She Came to the Valley (1979) (producer)
Metalstorm: The Destruction of Jared-Syn (dir. Charles Band, 1983) (executive producer)
Ghost Warrior (aka Swordkill) (dir. J. Larry Carroll, 1984) (executive producer)
Troll (dir. John Carl Buechler, 1986) (producer)
TerrorVision (dir. Ted Nicolaou, 1986) (producer)
Ghoulies II (1987) (producer)
Robot Jox (dir. Stuart Gordon, 1990) (producer)
The Pit and the Pendulum (dir. Stuart Gordon, 1991) (V) (producer)
Joey Takes a Cab (1991) (producer)
Honey, I Blew Up the Kid (dir. Randal Kleiser, 1992) (executive producer)
Doctor Mordrid (1992) (producer)
Trancers III (dir. C. Courtney Joyner, 1992) (V) (producer)
Remote (dir. Ted Nicolaou, 1993) (V) (producer)
Oblivion (dir. Sam Irvin, 1994) (co-producer)
Dragonworld (dir. Ted Nicolaou, 1994) (producer)
Pet Shop (dir. Hope Perello, 1994) (producer)
Castle Freak (dir. Stuart Gordon, 1995) (executive producer)
Magic Island (dir. Sam Irvin, 1995) (V) (producer)
Oblivion 2: Backlash (dir. Sam Irvin, 1996) (co-producer)
Zarkorr! The Invader (dir. Aaron Osborne, Michael Deak, 1996) (executive producer)

Director
The Young Guns (1956)
I Bury the Living (1958)
Face of Fire (1959)
Hercules and the Princess of Troy (1965) (TV)
Gli uomini dal passo pesante (1965)
Dracula's Dog (1978)
She Came to the Valley (1979)
Ghoulies II (1987)
Joey Takes a Cab (1991)
Doctor Mordrid (1992)
Robot Wars (1993)
Prehysteria! (1993)
Prehysteria! 2 (1994) (V)

Actor
Specter of the Rose (1946) (uncredited) .... Man
The Red Badge of Courage (1951) (uncredited) .... Union Soldier Fording River
End of the World (1977) .... Awards Party Guest
Tourist Trap (1979) (uncredited) .... Waxwork Grandfather
Troll (1986) .... Older Couple on TV
Trancers II (1991) .... Chili Man

Writer
The Red Badge of Courage (1951) (adaptation)
Footsteps in the Night (1957) (screenplay) (story)
Face of Fire (1959)
La leggenda di Enea (1962) (adaptation)
Duello nel Texas (1963) (screenplay)
Massacro al Grande Canyon (1964)
Gli uomini dal passo pesante (1965) (as Alfredo Antonini)
I crudeli (1967) (story)
Un minuto per pregare, un instante per morire (1968)
Auditions (1978)
She Came to the Valley (1979)

Other
From Beyond (production manager)

Notes

External links
 

1924 births
2002 deaths
American people of Lithuanian-Jewish descent
American film directors
American film producers
Film directors from Paris
French emigrants to the United States